Cécile Corbel (born 28 March 1980, in Pont-Croix, Finistère, France) is a French and Breton singer, harpist, and composer. She has released five albums of original music and worked for Studio Ghibli as a composer for its 2010 film, The Borrower Arrietty. Corbel sings in many languages including French, Italian, Breton, and English and has done songs in Spanish, German, Japanese, Irish, and Turkish. Her lifelong partner is songwriter Simon Caby, who is also her co-composer.

Biography

Early life

Cécile Corbel was born in Pont-Croix on 28 March 1980. As a child, she traveled all throughout Brittany with her parents, who had a traveling marionette show. She first learned to play guitar, and discovered the Celtic harp as a teenager during a concert by Greek harpist Elisa Vellia, who later became her teacher. At age 18, after obtaining a baccalauréat scientifique, she moved to Paris to study. She then entered the École du Louvre and earned a MAS in archaeology. She first performed in pubs and the streets of Paris, and gave her first official concert at the pub, Ti Jos, in 2002.

Professional debut

In 2005, she released an EP with six tracks, Harpe celtique et chants du monde. After she signed with the record label Keltia Musique, her first studio album was released in 2006. SongBook 1 contained Breton, Welsh, and Irish songs. After this release, she began to go on tour. In 2006, she went to Australia, where she performed at a French festival organized by the Alliance française of Adelaide. She opened Laurent Voulzy's concert at Olympia Hall in Paris, and also shared the stage with Altan, Lúnasa, Alan Stivell, Carlos Núñez Muñoz, Dan Ar Braz, Hélène Flaherty, Ousmane Touré, and Ariana Savall. She performed in many countries including Germany, Switzerland, Italy, England, Estonia, the Czech Republic, Poland, the Netherlands, the United States, Paraguay, and Burma. In 2008, SongBook vol. 2 was released, with the first 10 of the 12 songs composed by Corbel.

In 2009, she played the role of Anne of Brittany in the rock opera, Anne de Bretagne. Songwriter Alan Simon chose Cécile Corbel after having difficulty finding someone for the role. Also participating in the project were other musicians such as Tri Yann and Fairport Convention. The show was staged at the end of June 2009 at the Château des ducs de Bretagne in Nantes, and was preceded by an album in which over 200 musicians participated.

Work with Studio Ghibli

After promotion ended for SongBook vol. 2, Cécile still had some promo albums left, so she sent them to people she admired. She sent one to Studio Ghibli because she had been a fan of their films for years. At the time, The Borrower Arrietty was in pre-production and producer Toshio Suzuki wanted a Celtic-inspired film score. Less than ten days later, she received an email from Studio Ghibli about her CD. The envelope, because it was handwritten, had caught the eye of Suzuki, and he had listened to the CD. He was captivated by Corbel's voice and the sound of the harp, and played the CD for the film's director and Yamaha Music. As a result, Corbel was assigned to write the title song of the film. She was later asked to write more songs. By 2009, she was asked to compose the whole score. This was the first time a non-Japanese composer had worked with the studio.

The score combines the musical styles of Celtic folk music, medieval Turkish songs, Baroque madrigals, and Irish marches. It was recorded in France with a small orchestra including acoustic guitar, bass, a string quartet, bagpipes, Irish flutes, bodhrán, percussion instruments, and accordion. The soundtrack album won "Best Original Soundtrack Album" at the 2011 Japan Gold Disc Awards. It also became a RIAJ-certified gold record in Japan, where more than 200,000 copies were sold.

New albums and projects
In June 2011, the third studio album, SongBook vol. 3 – Renaissance was released.

In 2012, Cécile along with her long-time collaborator, Simon Caby were invited to Malaysia to perform at the 11th edition of the French Art and Film Festival 2012 (FAFF 2012) organized by the Alliance Française Kuala Lumpur and the Embassy of France in Malaysia. She performed at HELP University, Kuala Lumpur on 8 June and at the Golden Sands Resort, Penang on 9 June as part of the 50th anniversary of the Alliance Française Penang.

In early 2013, Cécile Corbel took part in La Nuit de la Bretagne, performing along with Dan Ar Braz at the Zeniths of Nantes, Lille, and Caen.

The fourth studio album, SongBook vol. 4 – Roses, was released on 24 June 2013. This album had influences from Mediterranean, medieval, and world music, including Japanese and Celtic music. It contains songs in French, English, Breton, and even Judaeo-Spanish ("Hija Mia"). Most of the twelve tracks are self-composed, and the album incorporates Breton and Irish traditional themes. It also includes a cover of "The Riddle", a song by English singer Nik Kershaw.

In 2013, Cécile Corbel wrote songs and co-composed (with Fabien Cali) the film score for the wildlife documentary, Land of the Bears. The soundtrack album was released 26 February 2014 by Polydor Records. Cécile sings five songs on the album. She also sings and plays harp on "Les Nuits Urbaines", the sixth track on Stanislas' album Ma Solitude, released on 28 April 2014.

On 26 June 2014, Cécile Corbel released a single, "Entendez-Vous", from her upcoming album. Her fifth studio album, La Fiancée, was released on 6 October 2014. All twelve songs on the album were written by Corbel, with music co-composed by Simon Caby. The album's musical style is a mixture of classical and pop music.

Group musicians

List of musicians that perform at concerts:
 Cécile Corbel – harp and voice
 Cyril Maurin – guitars
 Pascal Boucaud – bass and backing vocals
 Julien Grattard – cello
 Christophe Piot – percussion

Discography

 SongBook 1 (2006)
 SongBook vol. 2 (2008)
 SongBook vol. 3 – Renaissance (2011)
 SongBook vol. 4 – Roses (2013)
 La Fiancée (2014)
 Vagabonde (2016)
 Enfant du Vent (2019)
 SongBook vol. 5 – Notes (2021)

Awards

Japan Gold Disc Awards

|-
| 2011
| The Borrower Arrietty Soundtrack
| Best Original Soundtrack Album
| 
|}

Tokyo Anime Awards

|-
| 2011
| Cécile Corbel – The Borrower Arrietty
| Best Music
| 
|}

References

External links
Official website 

Studio Ghibli people
French harpists
French film score composers
French singer-songwriters
Breton musicians
Breton-language singers
New-age musicians
1980 births
Living people
People from Finistère
21st-century French singers
21st-century French women singers